The water polo tournament at the 1968 Summer Olympics was held from 14 to 25 October 1968, in Mexico City, Mexico.

Qualification

Groups

GROUP A
 (excluded)

GROUP B

While Australia had been accepted as one of the 16 teams, the Australian Olympic Committee, considering it a waste of money to send a team, did not endorse them. The players responded by paying their own way to travel to Mexico City, but after the AOC informed the organisers, the team were barred from competing.

Squads

Preliminary round

Group A

14 October 1968

15 October 1968

16 October 1968

17 October 1968

19 October 1968

20 October 1968

21 October 1968

22 October 1968

Group B

14 October 1968

15 October 1968

16 October 1968

17 October 1968

19 October 1968

20 October 1968

21 October 1968

22 October 1968

Classification round
24 October 1968 — 13th/15th place

24 October 1968 — 9th/12th place

24 October 1968 — 5th/8th place

24 October 1968 — Semi Finals

Final round
25 October 1968 — 13th place

25 October 1968 — 11th place

25 October 1968 — 9th place

25 October 1968 — 7th place

25 October 1968 — 5th place

25 October 1968 — Bronze Medal Match

25 October 1968 — Gold Medal Match

Final ranking

Medallists

References

Sources
 PDF documents in the LA84 Foundation Digital Library:
 Official Report of the 1968 Olympic Games, v.3 (download, archive) (pp. 449–466, 811–826)
 Water polo on the Olympedia website
 Water polo at the 1968 Summer Olympics (men's tournament)
 Water polo on the Sports Reference website
 Water polo at the 1968 Summer Games (men's tournament) (archived)

External links
 NBCsports
 Results

 
1968 Summer Olympics events
1968
1968 in water polo
1968